Russell Allan Doane is an American professional mixed martial artist currently competing in the Bantamweight division of the Ultimate Fighting Championship. He is the former Tachi Palace Fights Bantamweight Champion and King of the Cage Flyweight (135 lb) Champion.

Mixed martial arts career

Amateur career
Doane made his MMA debut as an amateur in April 2007, when he faced Chris Williams at Hawaii Fighting Championship: Stand Your Ground 3. He lost the via guillotine choke submission.

Early career
Doane made his professional MMA debut on March 15, 2008, when he faced Tyson Nam at Icon Sport: Baroni vs. Hose. He won his debut via TKO. Doane faced Frank Baca at KOTC: Ali'is on July 14, 2012 for the KOTC Flyweight Championship. He won the fight via unanimous decision.

He faced former UFC fighter Jared Papazian at Tachi Palace Fights 17 on November 14, 2013, for the TPF Bantamweight Championship. He won the fight via TKO (elbows) in the fourth round to win the championship.

Ultimate Fighting Championship
Following his championship win over Papazian in November 2013, Doane would make his UFC debut on January 4, 2014, against Leandro Issa at UFC Fight Night 34. He won the fight via technical submission.

Doane next faced Marcus Brimage on July 5, 2014 at UFC 175. He won the fight via split decision.

Doane faced Iuri Alcântara on September 13, 2014 at UFC Fight Night 51. He lost the fight via unanimous decision.

Doane faced Jerrod Sanders on July 12, 2015 at The Ultimate Fighter 21 Finale. He lost the fight via unanimous decision.

Doane was briefly linked to a bout with Michinori Tanaka on January 2, 2016 at UFC 195. However, Doane was forced from the bout with injury and replaced by Joe Soto.

Doane next faced Pedro Munhoz on July 7, 2016 at UFC Fight Night 90. He lost the fight via submission in the first round.

Doane was tabbed as a short notice replacement to face Mirsad Bektić in a featherweight bout on October 8, 2016 at UFC 204, filling in for Arnold Allen. He lost the fight via submission in the first round.

Doane faced Kwan Ho Kwak on June 17, 2017 at UFC Fight Night 111. He won the fight via TKO in the first round.

Doane faced Rani Yahya on February 24, 2018 at UFC on Fox 28. He lost the fight via submission in the third round.

It was reported that Doane was released from UFC on October 2, 2018.

Post-UFC career
As the first fight after his UFC release, Doane faced Diego Silva at Destiny MMA on March 2, 2019. He won the fight via unanimous decision.

Personal life
Before making his UFC debut, Doane was a full-time carpenter.

Championships and accomplishments

Mixed martial arts
Ultimate Fighting Championship
Submission of the Night (One time) 
808 Battleground
808 Battleground Bantamweight Championship (One time)
Destiny MMA
DMMA Bantamweight Championship (One time)
King of the Cage
KOTC Flyweight (135 lb) Championship (One time)
Tachi Palace Fights
TPF Bantamweight Championship (One time)
X-1 Fights
X-1 Bantamweight Championship (One time)

Mixed martial arts record

|Win
|align=center|16–8
|Diego Silva
|Decision (unanimous)
|Destiny MMA: Throwdown
|
|align=center|3
|align=center|5:00
|Waipahu, Hawaii, United States
|
|-
|Loss
|align=center|15–8
|Rani Yahya
|Submission (arm-triangle choke)
|UFC on Fox: Emmett vs. Stephens 
|
|align=center|3
|align=center|2:32
|Orlando, Florida, United States
|
|-
|Win
|align=center|15–7
|Kwan Ho Kwak
|TKO (punches)
|UFC Fight Night: Holm vs. Correia
|
|align=center|1
|align=center|4:09
|Kallang, Singapore
|
|-
|Loss
|align=center|14–7
|Mirsad Bektić
|Submission (rear-naked choke)
|UFC 204
|
|align=center|1
|align=center|4:22
|Manchester, England
|
|-
|Loss
|align=center|14–6
|Pedro Munhoz
|Submission (guillotine choke)
|UFC Fight Night: dos Anjos vs. Alvarez
|
|align=center|1
|align=center|2:08
|Las Vegas, Nevada, United States
|  
|-
|Loss
|align=center|14–5
|Jerrod Sanders
|Decision (unanimous)
|The Ultimate Fighter: American Top Team vs. Blackzilians Finale 
|
|align=center|3
|align=center|5:00
|Las Vegas, Nevada, United States
|
|-
|Loss
|align=center|14–4
|Iuri Alcântara
|Decision (unanimous)
|UFC Fight Night: Bigfoot vs. Arlovski
|
|align=center|3
|align=center|5:00
|Brasília, Brazil
|
|-
|Win
|align=center|14–3
|Marcus Brimage
|Decision (split)
|UFC 175
|
|align=center|3
|align=center|5:00
|Las Vegas, Nevada, United States
|
|-
|Win
|align=center|13–3
|Leandro Issa
|Technical Submission (triangle choke)
|UFC Fight Night: Saffiedine vs. Lim
|
|align=center|2
|align=center|4:59
|Marina Bay, Singapore
|
|-
|Win
|align=center|12–3
|Jared Papazian
|KO (elbows)
|Tachi Palace Fights 17
|
|align=center|4
|align=center|2:30
|Lemoore, California, United States
|
|-
|Loss
|align=center|11–3
|Kyle Aguon
|Decision (split)
|Pacific Xtreme Combat 38
|
|align=center|3
|align=center|5:00
|Mangilao, Guam
| 
|-
|Win
|align=center|11–2
|Tony Sanchez
|TKO (punches)
|Destiny MMA: Proving Grounds
|
|align=center|5
|align=center|0:59
|Honolulu, Hawaii, United States
| 
|-
|Win
|align=center|10–2
|Omar Avelar
|Submission (rear-naked choke)
|Destiny MMA: Na Koa 2
|
|align=center|1
|align=center|1:59
|Honolulu, Hawaii, United States
|
|-
|Loss
|align=center|9–2
|Michinori Tanaka
|Submission (rear-naked choke)
|Pacific Xtreme Combat 34
|
|align=center|3
|align=center|2:09
|Quezon City, Philippines
|
|-
|Win
|align=center|9–1
|Masato Sannai
|Decision (unanimous)
|Pacific Xtreme Combat 33
|
|align=center|3
|align=center|5:00
|Pasig, Philippines
|
|-
|Win
|align=center|8–1
|Frank Baca
|Decision (unanimous)
|KOTC: Ali'is
|
|align=center|5
|align=center|5:00
|Honolulu, Hawaii, United States
|
|-
|Win
|align=center|7–1
|Rich de los Reyes
|KO (punch)
|X-1/808 Battleground: Domination
|
|align=center|1
|align=center|N/A
|Honolulu, Hawaii, United States
|
|-
|Win
|align=center|6–1
|Bryson Hansen
|Submission (triangle choke)
|X-1: Heroes
|
|align=center| 1
|align=center| 2:59
|Honolulu, Hawaii, United States
| 
|-
|Win
|align=center|5–1
|Riley Dutro
|TKO (punches and elbows)
|X-1: Nations Collide
|
|align=center|1
|align=center|4:33
|Honolulu, Hawaii, United States
|
|-
|Win
|align=center|4–1
|Timothy Meeks
|Submission (triangle choke)
|X-1: Champions 2
|
|align=center|2
|align=center|1:28
|Honolulu, Hawaii, United States
|
|-
|Win
|align=center|3–1
|Jon Delos Reyes
|Submission (rear-naked choke)
|808 Battleground: Dropping Jaws
|
|align=center|1
|align=center|1:48
|Waipahu, Hawaii, United States
|
|-
|Win
|align=center|2–1
|Dwayne Haney
|TKO (punches and elbows)
|EliteXC: Return of the King
|
|align=center|1
|align=center|2:54
|Honolulu, Hawaii, United States
|
|-
|Loss
|align=center|1–1
|Mark Tajon
|Submission (armbar)
|KCM 7: Kauai Cage Match 7
|
|align=center|1
|align=center|2:14
|Lihue, Hawaii, United States
|
|-
|Win
|align=center| 1–0
|Tyson Nam
|TKO (punches)
| ICON Sport: Baroni vs. Hose
|
|align=center|1
|align=center|2:33
|Honolulu, Hawaii, United States
|
|}

Amateur mixed martial arts record

|-
|Loss
|align=center| 0–1
|Chris Williams
|Submission (guillotine choke)
|HFC - Stand Your Ground 3
|
|align=center|1
|align=center|0:22
|Honolulu, Hawaii, United States
|

See also
 List of current UFC fighters
 List of male mixed martial artists

References

External links
 
 

Living people
American male mixed martial artists
Mixed martial artists from Hawaii
Sportspeople from Honolulu
1986 births
American practitioners of Brazilian jiu-jitsu
American carpenters
Bantamweight mixed martial artists
Mixed martial artists utilizing Brazilian jiu-jitsu
Ultimate Fighting Championship male fighters